Engin Baytar (born 11 July 1983) is a Turkish professional footballer who plays as a winger for İstanbul Siirtgücüspor.

Engin Baytar was born and raised in Germany to Turkish parents. He first joined FC Gütersloh before transferring to Arminia Bielefeld in 2000. Engin Baytar spent four years with the club's reserve team before moving to Turkey-based club Maltepespor in 2004. He spent two at the club before moving to Gençlerbirliği, who loaned him out to Eskişehirspor for the second half of the 2008–2009 season. Engin Baytar wears the number 50 on his jersey because he is from the Central Anatolian Province of Nevsehir in Turkey. His father is from Trabzon and mother is from Nevsehir.

Trabzonspor

He was transferred to Trabzonspor at the beginning of the 2009–10 season and won the 2009–10 Turkish Cup, scoring in the Final against Rivals Fenerbahçe in a 3–1 win, where he became the Man of the Match as well as winning the 2010 Turkish Super Cup.

Galatasaray

On 17 August 2011, Engin Baytar joined Galatasaray for 2 years for a fee of €1.1 million. He made his first assist at the match against Bursaspor to Johan Elmander on 26 November. He scored his first goal with Galatasaray against Sivasspor. He was however also shown a red card in the same match. He returned to the club after a loan-spell for the new season, but did not make the 18-man league squad.

Career statistics
.

Club

Honours
Trabzonspor
Türkiye Kupası (1): 2009–10
Süper Kupa (1): 2010

Galatasaray
Süper Lig (2): 2011–12, 2012–13
Süper Kupa (1): 2012

Individual
 2009–10 Turkish Cup Final – Man of the Match

References

External links

 
 
 

1983 births
Living people
Turkish footballers
Turkey international footballers
German people of Turkish descent
Süper Lig players
Arminia Bielefeld players
Trabzonspor footballers
Eskişehirspor footballers
Gençlerbirliği S.K. footballers
Galatasaray S.K. footballers
Association football midfielders
Çaykur Rizespor footballers
People from Gütersloh
Sportspeople from Detmold (region)